Halinów  is a town in Mińsk County, Masovian Voivodeship, Poland, with 3,369 inhabitants (2006).

There is a train station in Halinów, and the Polish A2 motorway (part of the European route E30) runs nearby, just south of the town.

References

Cities and towns in Masovian Voivodeship
Mińsk County